Tidsrejsen (literally The Time Travel or The Voyage through Time in Danish) is a Danish television series in the form of a Nordic Christmas calendar that was shown over the Christmas period by the Danish Broadcasting Corporation in 2014. As per tradition for Nordic Christmas calendars, the series premiered on 1 December 2014 and ran for 24 episodes. It was written by Poul Berg and directed by Kaspar Munk. Tidsrejsen was filmed mostly in the town of Dragør on Amager, south of Copenhagen. The series has science fiction elements, such as a time machine, and has themes of young love and general love, as well as family, the idea that actions have consequences and the idea that people decide their own fate in life.

The Danish Broadcasting Corporation described the Christmas calendar series as "Back to the Future meets the romantic comedy", and there are indeed many references to the popular film trilogy, among other time travel films.

The series was rewritten into a novel by the main writer Poul Berg, and was released the same year in 2014. It follows the script for the TV series faithfully but with some added details.

Plot 
The Christmas calendar is about the 13-year-old girl Sofie (Bebiane Ivalo Kreutzmann). Her greatest desire is that her parents, who had divorced after last year's Christmas, get back together so they can celebrate Christmas as a family.

On 1 December, Sofie's paternal grandfather gives Sofie a "calendar present" (kalendergave, a Nordic tradition) – an invention called a "gyro", which he wants her to finish building, and which under the right conditions can warp space and time, I.E. be used as a time machine. The same day Sofie is visited by the new boy in her class, Dixie (Hannibal Harbo Rasmussen). He seems to be unusually interested in the gyro, knows many things about Sofie that he can't possibly know, and is furthermore being chased by two secret agents.

One night, where Sofie wants to find out who Dixie is and what he wants with her, the secret agents follow after her to the shack where Dixie is staying, after which he has to escape. Sofie travels back to 1984 with him, where he tells her that he is from the future, and that the secrets agents are chasing him because time-travelling is illegal in the future. Furthermore, Sofie invented the time machine that people use in the future.

In 1984, Sofie takes the opportunity to change her parents' past, so that they will remain together in the present. However, this action ends up having dire consequences.

Cast 
 Bebiane Ivalo Kreutzmann as Sofie Villadsen
 Hannibal Harbo Rasmussen as Dixie
 Lars Knutzon as Sofie's paternal grandfather (Alfred Villadsen) 
 Paw Henriksen as Grandfather Alfred from 1984
 Patricia Schumann as Camilla (Sofie's mother) 
 Amanda Rostgaard Phillipsen as Camilla from 1984
 Rolf Hansen as Henrik Villadsen (Sofie's father)
 Arto Louis Eriksen as Henrik from 1984
 Jasper Møller Friis as Birk Villadsen (Sofie's little brother)
 Karen-Lise Mynster as Sofie's paternal grandmother (Ruth Villadsen)
 Signe Skov as Ruth from 1984
 Kurt Ravn as Agent Grå (Agent Grey in English)
 Sigurd Holmen le Dous as Agent Rød (Agent Red in English)
 Stine Stengade as Agent Sort (alternative future Sofie, Agent Black in English)
 Søren Pilmark as Sølvræven (the Silverfox in English)
 Lucas Lynggaard Tønnesen as Oliver
 Niels-Martin Eriksen as Ragnar (Sofie's school teacher and fanatical Christian)
 William Rudbeck Lindhardt as Ragnar from 1984
 Liv Ingeborg Berg as Sofie og Dixie's daughter in 2044
 Fie London as Anna from 1984
 Signe Vaupel as Anna (Henrik's new girlfriend)
 Thomas Kirk as School clerk
 Robert Reinhold as Guldtand (Gold Tooth in English)
 Robin Koch as Robin
 Sonny Lahey as Computer voice
 Jonas Kriegbaum as Agent Brun (Agent Brown in English)
 Susanne Storm as Esther (Sofie's maternal grandmother, also called Måneskin or Moonshine in English)
 Lucas Munk Billing as Christmas tree salesman
 Gry Guldager Jensen as School teacher
 Johanne Bie as Emilie (Sofie's schoolmate)

Production 
Tidsrejsen is written by Poul Berg and directed by Kaspar Munk and is based on a concept developed by Nordisk Film TV A/S by Peter Hansen, Adam Neutzsky-Wulff, Philip LaZebnik and Lars Feilberg. When the main characters travel back in time to 1984, several things appear and/or are referenced from Danish 80's culture, including the use of the song Dig og mig by Dieters Lieder and references to the disk jockey Kim Schumacher.

The sound designer, Peter Albrechtsen, helped to create most of the sound for the series from scratch. For the technology that came from the future of 2044 he used many bird calls, warping them to sound like computerized sounds, and many sounds from NASA's archive on SoundCloud was also used. Almost all foaly was created by Finnish Heikki Kossi.

The series is primarily filmed in Dragør over the course of seven months. The theme song of the Christmas calendar is sung by Caroline Castell.

Episodes

Reception 
Politiken gave Tidsrejsen 5 out of six hearts, writing that the series is suspenseful and have a good plot. Politiken believes that it is alright for a children and young adult's TV series to seriously deal with present time culture in regards to divorce and how children view them in divorced families. On average, 1.02 million people watched Tidsrejsen, and had a viewership of about 47%, which made it the most successful Nordic Christmas calendar in Danish television in 11 years.

Tidsrejsen was criticised for its portrayal of the school teacher Ragnar, the only apparently Christian character, as a nasty and condescending type of person, and a fanatic, who wants to prevent scientific progression. Some people did not believe Christianity was taken seriously by the Danish Broadcasting Corporation. This view was shared by both Pernille Vigsø Bagge from the Socialist People's Party and Charlotte Dyremose, church spokesperson of the Conservative Party. However, DR producer Piv Bernth commented that the character was obviously a caricature in a series that is already fantastical, and that he develops from a fraud into a kind man throughout the series.

Awards 
Tidsrejsen won the prize for "Best short format television series" at the Robert Awards in 2015.

See also
 List of Christmas films

References

External links 
 Official website (Wayback Machine)
 Jul i Dragør – kom bag om Tidsrejsen (Danish behind the scenes)
 

DR TV original programming
DR television dramas
Danish drama television series
Danish science fiction television series
Danish time travel television series
Television series set in 1984
Television series set in 2014
Television series set in 2044
Danish children's television series
2014 Danish television series debuts
Christmas television series